Brooke Alexander (born December 13, 1963) is an American actress. She is best known for her role as con-artist Samantha Markham in As the World Turns (1994–1996).

Early life and education 
Alexander was born in Kailua, Hawaii. She attended the University of California, Los Angeles.

Career 
In 1980, she was Miss Hawaii World, later crowned Miss World America, giving her the right to compete in the 1980 Miss World pageant where she placed sixth runner-up. 

Alexander originated the role of con-artist Samantha Markham on As the World Turns in 1994 and played the role until 1996. She has had roles in Magnum, P.I., Island Son, P.S. I Luv U, Tattingers, and The Last Nightmaster and has also appeared on One Life to Live as Julia Michaels (2001).

She was host of the WorldBeat on CNN, then moved to Fox News in a correspondent capacity, also appearing daily in segments previewing the day's program schedule.

From 2006 to 2007, she was a host of the "Real Simple" lifestyle television program based on Real Simple magazine.

Personal life
On September 26, 2009, Alexander married tennis player Marko Zelenovic. She give birth to a son named Jace in 2004.

Filmography

Film

Television

References

External links

1963 births
American television actresses
American television personalities
American women television personalities
Living people
University of California, Los Angeles alumni
Actresses from Honolulu
Miss World 1980 delegates
21st-century American women